Matt Mitchell is an American football coach and former player who is the special teams coordinator and outside linebackers coach for the Wisconsin Badgers. He was the head football coach at Grand Valley State University in Allendale, Michigan from 2010 to 2022.

Playing career
Mitchell was a two-time, First-Team All-Midwest Conference selection as a defensive lineman during his playing career at Cornell College in Mount Vernon, Iowa, where he earned a B.S.S. in biology and secondary education in 1997.

Coaching career
From 2000 to 2003, Mitchell was an assistant coach serving as Linebackers coach at Wartburg College. From 2004 to 2009, he served as an assistant at Grand Valley State coach under Chuck Martin. Following the 2009 season, Mitchell was named head coach at Grand Valley State when Martin left to join former Grand Valley State head coach Brian Kelly at Notre Dame.

Personal life
Mitchell and his wife, Jen, are the parents of sons Trayton and RJ.

Head coaching record

References

External links
 Grand Valley State profile

Year of birth missing (living people)
Living people
American football defensive linemen
Cornell Rams football players
Grand Valley State Lakers football coaches
Wartburg Knights football coaches